The Office of Immigration Statistics (OIS) is an agency of the United States Department of Homeland Security under the Office of Strategy, Policy, and Plans.

Since the passage of the Homeland Security Act of 2002, the Department of Homeland Security's Office of Immigration Statistics has had the responsibility to carry out two statutory requirements: 1) To collect and disseminate to Congress and the public data and information useful in evaluating the social, economic, environmental, and demographic impact of immigration laws; and 2) To establish standards of reliability and validity for immigration statistics collected by the department's operational Components.

Introduction 

Located within the Department of Homeland Security's Office of Strategy, Policy, and Plans and focused on data collection and analysis, the Office of Immigration Statistics (OIS) is positioned to gather information from across the department and the entire federal government and to perform these centralizing analytic and dissemination functions.

The department's operational components require cross-cutting data to complete certain enforcement activities and to adjudicate certain claims. Congress seeks regular and comprehensive reporting on immigration benefits, immigration enforcement, border security, and migration inflows. Under the department's analytic agenda, senior leaders rely on detailed operational data and outcome metrics for strategic planning. Other executive branch actors also depend on empirical analysis to monitor and refine immigration policy. Most importantly, a firm commitment to transparency anchored in the collection and dissemination of clear and credible immigration data is essential to combating widespread confusion and misinformation about immigration trends, and to contribute to a more informed policy debate.

History 
Immigration reporting began with the "Steerage" (or "Passenger") Act of March 2, 1819, which required the Secretary of State to report to each session of Congress on the age, sex, occupation, and origins of passengers on arriving vessels. The Department of State performed these duties until the early 1870s, after which responsibility shifted to the Treasury Department's Bureau of Statistics, followed by the Department of Commerce and Labor in 1903, and then the Department of Labor in 1913. The Immigration and Naturalization Service (INS) was transferred from the Department of Labor to the Department of Justice in 1940, where it resided until 2003, when the components of INS were subsumed under the Department of Homeland Security (DHS).

Section 103 of the Immigration and Nationality Act of 1952 establishes OIS's modern mandate: in consultation with interested academics, government agencies, and other parties, to provide Congress and the public, on an annual basis, with information about immigration and the impact of immigration laws. Section 701 of the Homeland Security Act of 2002 transferred these duties from the Statistics Branch of the Office of Policy and Planning of the INS to the DHS Undersecretary for Management and charged OIS with establishing standards of reliability and validity for immigration statistics. OIS currently sits within DHS's Office of Strategy, Policy, and Plans, and collects data from DHS's various operational Components, including U.S. Customs and Border Protection (CBP), U.S. Immigration and Customs Enforcement (ICE), and U.S. Citizenship and Immigration Services (USCIS), as well as from other Federal agencies such as the Department of Justice, the Department of State, and the U.S. Census Bureau.

Core reports

The Yearbook of Immigration Statistics 
The Yearbook of Immigration Statistics is a compendium of tables that provides data on foreign nationals who, during a fiscal year, were granted lawful permanent residence (i.e., admitted as immigrants or became legal permanent residents), were admitted into the United States on a temporary basis (e.g., tourists, students, or workers), applied for asylum or refugee status, or were naturalized. The Yearbook also presents data on immigration enforcement actions, including alien apprehensions, removals, and returns.

Lawful Permanent Residents (LPRs) 
Lawful permanent residents (LPRs), also known as "green card" holders, are non-citizens who are lawfully authorized to live permanently within the United States. LPRs may accept an offer of employment without special restrictions, own property, receive financial assistance at public colleges and universities, and join the Armed Forces. They also may apply to become U.S. citizens if they meet certain eligibility requirements. The Immigration and Nationality Act (INA) provides several broad classes of admission for foreign nationals to gain LPR status, the largest of which focuses on admitting immigrants for the purpose of family reunification. Other major categories include economic and humanitarian immigrants, as well as immigrants from countries with relatively low levels of immigration to the United States.

The Office of Immigration Statistics (OIS) Annual Flow Reports on LPRs contain information obtained from foreign nationals' applications for LPR status on the number and characteristics of persons who became LPRs during a given fiscal year.

Refugees and Asylees 
A refugee is a person outside his or her country of nationality who is unable or unwilling to return to his or her country of nationality because of persecution or a well-founded fear of persecution on account of race, religion, nationality, membership in a particular social group, or political opinion. An asylee is a person who meets the definition of refugee and is already present in the United States or is seeking admission at a port of entry. Refugees are required to apply for Lawful Permanent Resident ("green card") status one year after being admitted, and asylees may apply for green card status one year after their grant of asylum.

The Office of Immigration Statistics (OIS) Annual Flow Reports on refugees and asylees contain information obtained from the Worldwide Refugee Admissions Processing System (WRAPS) of the Bureau of Population, Refugees, and Migration of the U.S. Department of State on the numbers and demographic profiles of persons admitted to the United States as refugees, and those applying for and granted asylum status during a given fiscal year.

Naturalizations 
Naturalization confers U.S. citizenship upon foreign nationals who have fulfilled the requirements Congress established in the Immigration and Nationality Act (INA). After naturalization, foreign-born citizens enjoy nearly all of the same benefits, rights, and responsibilities that the Constitution gives to native-born U.S. citizens, including the right to vote.

The Office of Immigration Statistics (OIS) Annual Flow Reports on naturalization contain information obtained from naturalization applications on the number and characteristics of persons aged 18 years and older who became naturalized US citizens during a given fiscal year.

Nonimmigrant Admissions 
Nonimmigrants are foreign nationals granted temporary admission into the United States. The major purposes for which nonimmigrant admission may be authorized include temporary visits for business or pleasure, academic or vocational study, temporary employment, or to act as a representative of a foreign government or international organization, among others.

The Office of Immigration Statistics (OIS) Annual Flow Reports on nonimmigrants contain information obtained from I-94 arrival records on the number and characteristics of nonimmigrant admissions to the United States during a given fiscal year.

Immigration Enforcement Actions 
The Department of Homeland Security (DHS) engages in immigration enforcement actions to prevent unlawful entry into the United States and to apprehend and repatriate aliens who have violated or failed to comply with U.S. immigration laws. Primary responsibility for the enforcement of immigration law within DHS rests with U.S. Customs and Border Protection (CBP), U.S. Immigration and Customs Enforcement (ICE), and U.S. Citizenship and Immigration Services (USCIS). CBP enforces immigration laws at and between the ports of entry, ICE is responsible for interior enforcement and for detention and removal operations, and USCIS adjudicates applications and petitions for immigration and naturalization benefits.

The Office of Immigration Statistics (OIS) annual Immigration Enforcement Actions reports contain information obtained from CBP and ICE case records and processed by OIS to describe the number and characteristics of foreign nationals found inadmissible, apprehended, arrested, detained, returned, or removed during a given fiscal year.

Population Estimates 
The Office of Immigration Statistics occasionally publishes population estimates of a particular subgroup. Population estimates take information on immigration flows and may combine it with other counts or estimates, such as those in the U.S. Census Bureau's American Community Survey (ACS), as well as demographic life expectancy tables to give an idea of population size and characteristics in a given year. Terminology, data sources, and methodology may have shifted over time. Current series include population estimates for unauthorized immigrants, nonimmigrants, and lawful permanent residents.

Additional reports

Enforcement Priorities 

The Department of Homeland Security (DHS) engages in immigration enforcement actions to prevent unlawful entry into the United States and to apprehend and repatriate aliens who have violated or failed to comply with U.S. immigration laws. In 2014, the Secretary of Homeland Security announced a number of measures to strengthen and unify the department's immigration enforcement priorities by concentrating resources on the arrest, detention, and removal of individuals identified as posing a threat to national security, public safety, or border security. The 2014 priorities emphasize criminal convictions over criminal arrests and focus on felonies and significant or multiple misdemeanors over minor infractions of the law. The priorities also focus on forward-looking efforts to further reduce unlawful migration by targeting recent border crossers and those who significantly abuse the visa system.

Immigration Statistics Fact Sheets 

In addition to its regularly published yearbook and flow reports, the Office of Immigration Statistics also occasionally publishes various shorter fact sheets on widely varying topics ranging from characteristics of those apprehended at the border in a given time period to reports on immigrants' interstate migration between the acquisition of lawful permanent resident (LPR) status and citizenship. Reports may use Department of Homeland Security (DHS) data or publicly available data from other sources, such as from the U.S. Census Bureau.

Immigration Infographics 

Immigration Infographics produced by OIS describe key immigration topics such as the number and characteristics of lawful permanent residents, refugees and asylees, naturalizations, nonimmigrant admissions, and immigration enforcement actions.

Historical Library 

The historical library was created in 1987 as part of the legacy Immigration and Naturalization Service (INS) History Office. Its mission is to track the agency history and the implementation of federal government immigration policy from 1891—when the federal government first created the Immigration Bureau—through its present time. The U.S. Citizenship and Immigration Services (USCIS) is now the government agency that oversees lawful immigration to the U.S.

External links
 Homepage of the Office of Immigration Statistics

References 

Immigration to the United States
Immigration Statistics
Federal Statistical System of the United States